Gällstads FK is a Swedish football club located in Gällstad.

Background
Gällstads FK were formed on the ist October 2001 following the amalgamation of Gällstads AIS & Gällstads IF.

Gällstads FK currently plays in Division 4 Västergötland Södra which is the sixth tier of Swedish football. They play their home matches at the Åvalla in Gällstad.

The club is affiliated to Västergötlands Fotbollförbund. GFK has played prestigious friendly games against Aston Villa FC in 2005 and Reading FC in 2006.

Season to season

Gällstads AIS played in Västergötland Södra until the end of the 2001 season.

Gällstads FK took the place of Gällstads AIS for the 2002 season.

Footnotes

External links
 Gällstads FK – Official website
 Gällstads FK on Facebook

Football clubs in Västra Götaland County
2001 establishments in Sweden